The initials TPK may refer to:
 Tai Ping Koon Restaurant
 Te Puni Kōkiri, the Ministry of Māori Development, New Zealand
 Total party kill in role-playing games
 Turun Pallokerho, football club in Turku, Finland
 TPK algorithm, a simple program introduced by Luis Trabb Pardo and Donald Knuth, to compare early programming languages